Jamao al Norte is a town in the Espaillat province of the Dominican Republic.

References

Sources 
 – World-Gazetteer.com

Municipalities of the Dominican Republic
Populated places in Espaillat Province